The Golden Grand Prix Kawasaki is a track and field competition at the Japan National Stadium in Tokyo, Japan as part of the World Athletics Continental Tour. It was first organized in 2011 at the Todoroki Athletics Stadium in Kawasaki and sponsored by Seiko. It replaced the Osaka Grand Prix as the major athletics meet in Japan.

In 2013 the Seiko Golden Grand Prix Japanese leg of IAAF World Challenge moved from Kawasaki to Japan National Stadium in Tokyo. Meanwhile the 2018 edition moved back to Yanmar Stadium Nagai in Osaka. From 2020 onwards the meeting again was held in Tokyo.

Meet records

Men

Women

References

External links
Seiko Golden Grand Prix web site

Annual track and field meetings
IAAF World Challenge
Recurring sporting events established in 2011
Athletics competitions in Japan